Petit-Enghien is a town of Wallonia and a district of the municipality of Enghien, located in the province of Hainaut, Belgium. 

It was a municipality until the fusion of the Belgian municipalities in 1977.

Petit-Enghien has around 1770 inhabitants. As with Enghien, Petit-Enghien was originally Dutch-speaking, but became majority French-speaking mostly through the education system. Petit-Enghien is near the language border, and as part of Enghien, it is a municipality with language facilities.

Petit-Enghien was the site of Belgian cyclist and multiple Tour de France winner Eddy Merckx's first ever victory on October 1, 1961.

References

Former municipalities of Hainaut (province)
Enghien